Sewall's Point is a town located on the peninsula of the same name in Martin County, Florida, United States. The population was 1,991 at the 2020 census. Both the town and the peninsula are named for Capt. Henry Edwin Sewall (August 22, 1848 – August 1, 1925). It is an eastern suburb of Stuart, the Martin county seat.

Geography
Sewall's Point is located in northeastern Martin County at  (27.195, –80.198). Occupying a peninsula, it is bordered by water on the south, east, and west. On the south and west is the St. Lucie River and to the east is the Indian River Lagoon. On the north it is bordered by unincorporated Jensen Beach.

Demographics

2020 census

As of the 2020 United States census, there were 1,991 people, 863 households, and 607 families residing in the town.

2010 census
As of the census of 2010, there were 1,999 people, 758 households, and 607 families residing in the town. The racial makeup of the town was 98.72% White, 0.41% African American, 0.41% Asian, 0.10% from other races, and 0.36% from two or more races. Hispanic or Latino of any race were 1.39% of the population.

There were 758 households, out of which 33.4% had children under the age of 18 living with them, 73.4% were married couples living together, 4.4% had a female householder with no husband present, and 19.8% were non-families. 15.3% of all households were made up of individuals, and 6.5% had someone living alone who was 65 years of age or older.  The average household size was 2.57 and the average family size was 2.85.

In the town, the population was spread out, with 24.6% under the age of 18, 2.9% from 18 to 24, 19.9% from 25 to 44, 33.0% from 45 to 64, and 19.7% who were 65 years of age or older.  The median age was 47 years. For every 100 females, there were 98.4 males.  For every 100 females age 18 and over, there were 96.8 males.

The median income for a household in the town was $97,517, and the median income for a family was $104,893. Males had a median income of $82,748 versus $32,500 for females. The per capita income for the town was $55,121.  About 4.6% of families and 4.3% of the population were below the poverty line, including 5.5% of those under age 18 and 3.8% of those age 65 or over.

On September 26, 2004, Hurricane Jeanne made landfall on Hutchinson Island, just east of Sewall's Point, exactly three weeks after Hurricane Frances did so at the same location.

Notable people
 Tori Amos, singer/pianist
 James F. Hutchinson, fine arts painter since 1948, Florida Hall of Fame, home/studio in Sewall's Point
 Vaughn Monroe, baritone singer, trumpeter and big band leader and actor, lived in Sewall's Point
 1st Lieutenant Francis Tyndall, USAAC, World War I fighter pilot, Silver Star recipient, and namesake of Tyndall Air Force Base, Florida

See also
 Capt. Henry E. Sewall House,  built at the tip of Sewall's Point in 1889, moved in 1910 to Port Sewall, now located in Indian RiverSide Park

References

External links
 

Populated places on the Intracoastal Waterway in Florida
Towns in Martin County, Florida
Port St. Lucie metropolitan area
Indian River Lagoon
Towns in Florida